Horse island is a historical site recognized in many primary sourced letters and battle records.  It is an egg-shaped island with an area of about 24 acres, located in Sackets Harbor on Lake Ontario in upstate New York.  The island was the site of the Battle of Sacket's Harbor and has a notable lighthouse on it.

The Battle of Sackets
The battle that took place on the island is the Battle of Sackets Harbor that happened in May 1813 that was a part of the War of 1812.  When Britain and New America were fighting both sides built up their navies and raced to gain dominance over the great lake region.  Gaining access to these lakes would be a vital resource to help win the war.  Gen. Sir George Prevost, Governor-General of Canada and representing Britain, planned to attack American troops on Horse Island.  This island at the time was relatively untouched by humans and created a great vantage point on the nearby land that the Americans were in control of.  

The Americans, under the leader of Jacob Brown, were anticipating this attack and had a camp set up there in order to train new troops.  When this anticipated attack occurred it lasted for about three hours on horse island and the surrounding areas.  The Americans were initially able to keep the British from coming ashore but when they did the Americans retreated to the mainland.  The British could not follow them because they were not able to scale the cliffs of the mainland.  The British retreated from the shores at about nine in the morning when the Americans started winning the battle.  

The people credited with directly defending Horse island are John Mills and his leading group of Albany volunteers that made up Camp Volunteer on the island.

Horse Island lighthouse 

Even though Sackets Harbor has been developed over the last 200 years, Horse Island remains relatively barren.  In 1831, Congress allocated $4,000 to build a lighthouse on Horse Island.  This was necessary because of the rocky area and the high cliff in the area.  In both 1857 and 1870 funds were used to either renovate or rebuild the lighthouse on the island.   The island is relatively off limits to the public, save for the battle field which is open year round, so seeing the lighthouse may be difficult.  Most visit the site by viewing the lighthouse from the main land battle site that sports a view of the lighthouse.

Archeological findings 
Another notable aspect of Horse island is that it is a destination for a variety of archeologists.  Hartgen Archeological Associates, Inc. is one of the leaders of a new archeology group that set out to uncover different findings at Horse Island.  The archeologists research the artifacts discovered on the island.  Most of the artifacts are from the battle that occurred in 1813.  With metal detectors and other instruments, archeologists have been able to research how the battle on the island happened in terms of potential skirmish lines and defensive positions.

References

Islands of New York (state)
Lake Ontario
History of New York (state)
Military history of New York (state)